Jennifer Muñoz may refer to:

 Jennifer Muñoz (Guatemalan footballer) (born 1993), Guatemalan international footballer
 Jennifer Muñoz (Mexican footballer) (born 1996), Mexican international footballer